Blue Water Area Transit is the primary provider of mass transportation in St. Clair County, Michigan. Service was first initiated in 1976, after private providers ceased transit operations. From Monday through Saturday, six local routes are provided, plus the Shopper Shuttle to connect the Court of Flags Mall and various big box stores. On weekdays, two commuter routes are provided to Chesterfield Township, a growing Detroit suburb that features a variety of suburban office parks. Routes are also timed in conjunction with Suburban Mobility Authority for Regional Transportation, to allow riders to transfer to Route 560 to reach Downtown Detroit.

Route list 
1 – Electric Ave
2 – 24 St.
3 – Sams Club transfer
4 – Holland
5 – Pine Grove/ Mall
6 – Home Depot
9 – Beard/Dove
Shopper Shuttle – Fort Gratiot retail
I-94 Express
M-29 North & South
Fort Gratiot demand response
Burtchville demand response
Port Huron Township demand response
Marysville demand response
Handicap direct rides

Hours 
Monday through Thursday – 6:00 am – 11:00 pm
Friday – 6:00 am – 11:05 pm
Saturday – 7:45 am – 11:05 pm
Sunday – CLOSED

Contact 
Dispatch – (810) 987-7373

Cost 
Adult fare - $.80
Children 17 and under - $.65
Senior/disabled - $.40
Under 5 – free

Blue Water Transit Bus Center
The Blue Water Transit Bus Center is the primary transfer hub for Blue Water Area Transit. It opened in December 2015 providing more than 2,000 daily passengers who come downtown a safe and efficient means to transfer buses. Buses enter and depart in different directions and wait for passengers in two sheltered parallel lanes. The $9.8 million facility includes a small store as well as underground boilers to keep the sidewalks snow and ice free in winter.

References 
Blue Water Area Transit Brochure – 12/2011

External links 
 BWBus

Bus transportation in Michigan
Transportation in St. Clair County, Michigan
Port Huron, Michigan